The 2016 TNM Super League was the 31st season of the Super League of Malawi, the top professional league for association football clubs in Malawi since its establishment in 1986. The season played between 16 April and 31 December 2016. Nyasa Big Bullets were the defending champions for the second consecutive year. Kamuzu Barracks won their first league title.

Teams 
A total of sixteen teams will contest the league including thirteen teams from the previous season and three teams promoted from regional leagues: Dwangwa United (Central Region Football League), Max Bullets (Southern Region Football league) and Karonga United (Northern Region Football league).

Super League of Malawi (SULOM) decided to extend the top level to 16 clubs; the additional place is contested by the three relegated teams in a play-off.

The relegation play-off was played on 11–13 March between Airborne Rangers and FISD Wizards at Civo Stadium in Lilongwe and ended with the victory of the FISD Wizard, who remained in the TNM Super League.

Dedza Young Soccer, withdrew from play-off after obtained a court injunction against this play-off after the first match was played, arguing they should have been elected to remain at the top level without any play-off, later, Dedza Young Soccer, decided to withdraw the injunction but maintaining decision to not participate in play-off.

League table

Results

Top scorers

References

External links
Official Website

2016
Premier League
Malawi